Kalyana Kacheri is a 1997 Indian Malayalam film, directed by Anil Chandra and produced by Babu Pathanamthitta. The film stars Mukesh, Shobhana, Jagathy Sreekumar and KPAC Lalitha in the lead roles. The film has musical score by S. P. Venkatesh. The film was became received positive reviews from critics and audiences alike and mixed  to  appreciated and criticised the family  drama considered .

Cast

Mukesh as Ambadi Arjunan Nair
Shobhana as Gopika Varma 
Jagathy Sreekumar as Ambadi Balaraman Nair 
Baiju Santhosh as Balanchandran
KPAC Lalitha as Devakiyamma 
Darshana as Meenu
M. R. Gopakumar
Kanya Bharathi
Sindhu Jacob as Seetha Nair 
N. F. Varghese
Ravi Vallathol as Ananthan Varma 
Augustine as Sub-Inspector Vargesh 
Bindu Ramakrishnan
Kunjandi
Mafia Sasi
Mamukkoya as Bharghavan Pilla 
Kozhikode Narayanan Nair

Plot
A contractor Arjunan, has financial troubles and tries to fake a suicide to get away from debt. He gets caught by police along with a stranger lady Gopika, who coincidentally happens to be there. They lie to the cops that they are lovers and the police SI forces them to get married. After this incident, they part ways. Arjunan and his friend find her address and reach her village to create a ruckus there. They discover that a different girl lives there and comes back.  Meanwhile, his uncle's marriage get fixed with Gopika. Arjunan opposes this proposal. He talks to Gopika and asks her to back out from this marriage. Gopika's family has some past family issues which are creating issues in the present. They have to prevent this marriage somehow. This follows the rest of the story.

Soundtrack
The music was composed by S. P. Venkatesh and the lyrics were written by Gireesh Puthenchery.

References

External links
 

1997 films
1990s Malayalam-language films